Mohammad-Ali Hosseini was the deputy Minister of Foreign Affairs of Iran. He was the spokesperson of the ministry from 2007 until 2010 and also vice minister of parliamentary affairs. Currently he is Ambassador of Islamic Republic of Iran to Pakistan.

Seyed Mohammad Ali Hosseini in an exclusive interview with IRNA in Islamabad said Foreign Minister Shah Mahmood Qureshi’s visit is considered very important at this critical time because Iran and Pakistan as two main neighbors of Afghanistan have been exposed to the consequences of the 20-year occupation of the country by the United States and its Western allies.

With his efforts Pakistan and Iran Inaugurated the third border crossing point at Pishin Mand region in balochistan, The two countries inaugurated the Rimadan-Gabd border gateway in December last year, whereas the Taftan border has been operational for decades.

References

Iranian Vice Ministers
Ambassadors of Iran to Italy
Living people
Spokespersons for the Ministry of Foreign Affairs of Iran
Year of birth missing (living people)
Ambassadors of Iran to Pakistan